Gustave C. Haysler House is a historic home located at Clinton, Henry County, Missouri.  It was built about 1896, and is two-story, Queen Anne style frame dwelling. It features steep hipped roofs, front porch with classical columns, and a cylindrical tower.

It was listed on the National Register of Historic Places in 1995.

References

Houses on the National Register of Historic Places in Missouri
Queen Anne architecture in Missouri
Houses completed in 1896
Buildings and structures in Henry County, Missouri
National Register of Historic Places in Henry County, Missouri